Guillermo Cañas was the defending champion, but did not participate.

Guillermo Coria won the title, defeating Carlos Moyá 6–2, 4–6, 6–2 in the final.

Seeds

Draw

Finals

Top half

Bottom half

References

External links
 Main draw
 Qualifying draw

Croatia Open Umag